Chaiti Ghoshal is a Bengali film and television actress.

Filmography

Television 
 Ek Akasher Niche
 Jamai Raja
 Tomay Amay Mile
 Arakshaniya
 Mohona
 Bouma Ekghor

See also 
 Manasi Sinha
 Laboni Sarkar

References

External links 
 

Living people
Actresses in Bengali cinema
Indian film actresses
Indian television actresses
Bengali actresses
Place of birth missing (living people)
Year of birth missing (living people)
20th-century Indian actresses
21st-century Indian actresses